Jonathan White may refer to:

Jonathan White (cricketer) (born 1979), English cricketer
Jonathan White (admiral) (born c. 1957), U.S. Navy admiral and oceanographer
Jonathan White (musician), bassist for Faithless, Groove Armada, Magazine and John Squire 
Jonathan White (actor) in Playdate
Jonathon White (rugby), rugby referee
Jonathan White (1955–1988), victim of Pan Am Flight 103, son of actor David White
Jon White (rugby union) (Jonathon White, born 1935), Australian rugby union player
Jonathan White (painter) (1938-q2021), New Zealand Artist

See also
Jon White (disambiguation)
John White (disambiguation)
Jack White (disambiguation)
John Whyte (disambiguation)